Gary Taylor is a former American football and baseball coach.  He served as the head football coach at Wheaton College in Wheaton, Illinois for two seasons, from 1971 to 1972, compiling a record of 2–16.

References

Living people
Year of birth missing (living people)
Wheaton Thunder baseball coaches
Wheaton Thunder football coaches